Frances Hardinge (born 1973) is a British children's writer. Her debut novel, Fly By Night, won the 2006 Branford Boase Award and was listed as one of the School Library Journal Best Books. Her 2015 novel The Lie Tree won the 2015 Costa Book Award, the first children's book to do so since Philip Pullman's The Amber Spyglass in 2001. She has also been shortlisted for and received a number of other awards for both her novels as well as some of her short stories.

Biography 

Hardinge was born in Brighton, England, and dreamed of writing at the age of four. She studied English at Somerville College, University of Oxford and was the founder member of a writers' workshop there.

Her writing career started after she won a short story magazine competition. Shortly after winning she wrote Fly By Night in her spare time and showed it to Macmillan Publishers after pressure from a friend.

Hardinge is often seen wearing a black hat and enjoys dressing in old-fashioned clothing.

Awards and honours

2006: Branford Boase Award, winner, Fly by Night
2011: Guardian Award, short-list, Twilight Robbery
2012: Kitschies, short-list, A Face Like Glass
2015: Carnegie Medal, short-list, Cuckoo Song
2015: Costa Book Awards, winner, children's, The Lie Tree
2015: Costa Book Awards, winner, Book of the Year, The Lie Tree
2015: Robert Holdstock Award, winner, best fantasy novel, Cuckoo Song
2016: Carnegie Medal, short-list, The Lie Tree
2016: Boston Globe-Horn Book award, winner, The Lie Tree

Works

Novels 
 Fly By Night (2005)
 Verdigris Deep (2007); US title, Well Witched
 Gullstruck Island (2009); US title, The Lost Conspiracy
 Twilight Robbery (2011); US title, Fly Trap – sequel to Fly by Night
 A Face Like Glass (2012)
 Cuckoo Song (2014)
 The Lie Tree (2015)
 A Skinful of Shadows (September 2017)
 Deeplight (October 2019)
 Unraveller (September 2022)

Short fiction 

Hardinge has written several short stories published in magazines and anthologies.

 "Shining Man", The Dream Zone 8 (Jan 2001)
 "Communion", Wordplay 1 (Spring 2002)
 "Captive Audience", Piffle 7 (Oct 2002)
 "Bengal Rose", Scribble 20 (Spring 2003)
 "Black Grass", All Hallows 43 (Summer 2007)
 "Halfway House", Alchemy 3 (Jan 2006)
 "Behind The Mirror", serialised in First News (2007)
 "Payment Due", in Under My Hat: Tales from the Cauldron, ed. Jonathan Strahan (Random House, 2012)
 "Flawless", in Twisted Winter, ed. Catherine Butler (Black, 2013)
 "Hayfever", Subterranean, Winter 2014 (Dec 2013)
 "Blind Eye", The Outcast Hours, ed. Mahvesh Murad and Jared Shurin (Solaris, 2019)
 "God's Eye", in Mystery & Mayhem, (Egmont Publishing, 2016)

References

External links 
 
 Fly by Night, Blog by Day — Tour blog
 
 

1973 births
Living people
English children's writers
English fantasy writers
Dark fantasy writers
Alumni of Somerville College, Oxford
British women novelists